Whitehorse Mountain or White Horse Mountain may refer to:

 Whitehorse Mountain (New York) in the Black Rock Forest, New York, U.S.
 Whitehorse Mountain (Washington), U.S.
 Whitehorse Mountain (British Columbia) in the Cariboo Mountains, Canada
 Whitehorse Mountains in California, U.S.
 White Horse Mountains, in Oregon, U.S.